Kinloss Barracks is a military installation located near the village of Kinloss, on the Moray Firth in the north of Scotland. Until 2012 it was a Royal Air Force (RAF) station, RAF Kinloss.

History

RAF Kinloss 

The Royal Air Force station RAF Kinloss opened at the site on 1 April 1939 and served as a training airfield during the Second World War. After the war it was handed over to Coastal Command to watch over Russian ships and submarines in the Norwegian Sea. Until 2010 it was the main base for the RAF's fleet of Nimrod MR2 maritime patrol aircraft. It was intended that the MR2 would be replaced by the Nimrod MRA4, but the MRA4 was cancelled in the Strategic Defence and Security Review of October 2010. Kinloss then became surplus to RAF use and regular flying operations ceased on 31 July 2011.

Transfer to British Army 
On 18 July 2011, the MOD announced that RAF Kinloss would become a British Army barracks, with army units arriving in 2014 or 2015. A further announcement in November 2011 confirmed that 39 Engineer Regiment (Air Support) of the Royal Engineers would move from Waterbeach Barracks, near Cambridge, to Kinloss, in July 2012. It was expected that 930 service personnel and their families would move at this time. The number of army personnel based at Kinloss would be 41% down on the number of personnel which were present during the RAF's tenure.

After 73 years as an RAF station, control of Kinloss transferred to the British Army at 1200 on 26 July 2012. A ceremony was attended by eight former RAF Kinloss station commanders, the last station commander Group Captain JJ Johnston, the Lord Lieutenant of Moray and invited guests. The RAF colours were lowered for the last time and British Army colours raised to mark the new chapter in Kinloss's history.

The airfield was maintained by the RAF as a relief landing ground for aircraft based at nearby RAF Lossiemouth and continued to be used by Moray Flying Club. It could not be booked by other aircraft as a diversion airfield or for refuelling stops.

In 2020, Boris Johnson, the UK Prime Minister visited Kinloss barracks and to hear about three Puma helicopters used to support the National Health Service and how personnel there were helping with mobile COVID-19 testing units.

During 2020, regular flying temporarily returned to Kinloss when the first of the RAF's Poseidon MRA1 fleet arrived in the UK from the US in February 2020, initially operating from the barracks whilst work was carried out at RAF Lossiemouth to accommodate the new aircraft. Lossiemouth's airfield was closed between 10 August and 16 October 2020 whilst the intersection of its two runways was resurfaced. During the closure, routine Typhoon FGR4 training operations were relocated to Kinloss. A second Poseidon arrived before they and the Typhoons departed for Lossiemouth on the re-opening of the airfield in October 2020.

The runway at Kinloss was permanently closed during 2021 and the military aerodrome traffic zone around the airfield withdrawn in January 2022. Moray Flying Club relocated to Lossiemouth.

In early 2022, Orbex, a commercial space rocket manufacturer established a test site at Kinloss Barracks. The site is used for the testing of launch procedures for the company's orbital launch vehicle known as Prime. The rocket is intended to launch small satellites into low-earth orbit. Actual launches will take place from Space Hub Sutherland, located on the A' Mhòine peninsula in the Highlands.

Based units
The following notable units are based at Kinloss Barracks.

British Army
 Royal Engineers (8 Engineer Brigade, 12 (Force Support) Engineer Group)
39 Engineer Regiment (Air Support)
34 Field Squadron
48 Field Squadron
53 Field Squadron
60 Headquarters & Support Squadron
65 Field Support Squadron
71 Engineer Regiment (Air Support) (Army Reserve)
124 Field Squadron (Air Support)
236 Troop

Defence High Frequency Communications Service (DHFCS) 
 DHFCS Kinloss

Operations

Royal Engineers 
39 Engineer Regiment is tasked with providing air support engineering, such as repair of airfield operating surfaces, to both the RAF and to the British Army, and is the only regular regiment focused on providing such a capability. Around 800 personnel are based at Kinloss.

Defence High Frequency Communications Service (DHFCS) 
Kinloss Barracks is home to a high frequency receiver station and network control centre forming part of the Defence High Frequency Communications Service. Prior to 2003 the system at Kinloss was operated by No. 81 Signals Unit (Detachment North) of the RAF. The station is now operated by Babcock International Group on behalf of the Ministry of Defence.

Future

Further army personnel 
The Army Basing Programme, part of the wider Army 2020 programme, is expected to result in further army personnel relocating to Kinloss Barracks by 2022.

See also 

 List of British Army installations
 List of Royal Air Force stations

References

External links 
British Army – 39 Engineer Regiment
UK Military Aeronautical Information Publication – Kinloss (EGQK)

1938 establishments in Scotland
Barracks in Scotland
Installations of the British Army
Buildings and structures in Moray
Government buildings completed in 1938